2022 World Junior-B Curling Championships may refer to:

2022 World Junior-B Curling Championships (January), championship held to qualify teams for the 2022 World Junior Curling Championship
2022 World Junior-B Curling Championships (December), championship held to qualify teams for the 2023 World Junior Curling Championship